Morolo (locally ) is a comune (municipality) in the Province of Frosinone in the Italian region Lazio, located about  southeast of Rome and about  west of Frosinone.

Morolo borders the following municipalities: Ferentino, Gorga, Sgurgola, Supino.

People
Ernesto Biondi

Sister cities
 Hosszúhetény, Hungary

References

External links
 Official website

Cities and towns in Lazio